Symmetricom, Inc. (NASDAQ: SYMM) (acquired by Microsemi in 2013, then acquired by Microchip in 2018) develops, manufactures, and supplies timekeeping technology to customers in industry and government worldwide that require extremely precise synchronization. Symmetricom products supported precise timing standards, including GPS-based timing, IEEE 1588 (PTP), Network Time Protocol (NTP), Synchronous Ethernet and Data Over Cable Service Interface Specifications (DOCSIS®) timing.

Products included hydrogen masers, rubidium and cesium atomic standards, temperature and oven controlled crystal oscillators, miniature and chip scale atomic clocks, network time servers, network sync management systems, cable timekeeping solutions, telecom synchronization supply units (SSUs), and timing test sets.

Symmetricom was one of the only two world’s commercial supplier of cesium atomic standards (atomic clocks) - the other one is Oscilloquartz, in Switzerland.

By weighted average, Symmetricom atomic clocks contributed over 90% of UTC (Coordinated Universal Time, the world time standard). The BIPM (International Bureau of Weights and Measures) calculates UTC by averaging the combined contributions of the national laboratories of its member countries.

Symmetricom was headquartered in San Jose, California with research and development centers in Boulder, Colorado; Beverly, Massachusetts; Tuscaloosa, Alabama; and Beijing, China.

References 

 Symmetricom was acquired by Microsemi in Oct 2013
 Microsemi was acquired by Microchip in 2018

Companies based in Silicon Valley
Electronics companies of the United States